Eupithecia adelpha is a moth in the family Geometridae. It is found in Armenia.

References

Moths described in 1975
adelpha
Moths of Asia